The World Squash Federation (WSF) is the international federation for squash, an indoor racket sport which was formerly called "squash rackets". The WSF is recognised by the International Olympic Committee (IOC) as the International Federation (IF) for squash, and is also a member of the Global Association of International Sports Federations and the Association of the IOC Recognised International Sports Federations (ARISF).

It is based in Hastings in England. As of 2021 it has 122 member federations. 

The first squash court was built in England in 1865; there are now around 50,000 courts in more than 185 nations worldwide. To harness this growth and to promote and co-ordinate the sport, the International Squash Rackets Federation (ISRF) was formed in 1967, its name being changed in 1992 to the World Squash Federation (WSF).

Presidents
Below is the list of presidents since 1967 :

Membership
The WSF has 122 Members, all of whom are National Associations of squash, recognised by their National Olympic Committee (NOC) or Ministry of Sport as the sole and undisputed governing body for the sport in the country. Members are required to join one of the five Regional Federations which are an integral part of the WSF structure. Members receive a number of votes to be used at General Meetings depending on the number of squash courts in their country.

Management

The WSF is managed by an executive board (the board), responsible for day-to-day control of the Federation and an executive committee (ExCo) which assists the board in the strategy and policy making process. Members of the board are elected at general meetings and consist of a president and three vice-presidents, who each serve four year terms of office. One additional vice-president may be co-opted on an annual basis if required.

ExCo comprises all members of the board plus one regional vice-president appointed by each of the five Regional Federations. The chairman of the Athletes Commission and a representative of PSA are members of ExCo.

The board is supported by a number of committees, commissions and panels whose members are volunteers with specialist knowledge coming from the Regional Federations and Player Association. The WSF employs professional staff who are responsible for implementing the decisions of these bodies whose main activities are described below.

Actions

World calendar of events
The WSF works closely with the Player Association – the Professional Squash Association (PSA) – to control and co-ordinate the world calendar for squash. Championships are held in all major squash playing nations and are integrated with the World Championships and Major Games calendar to ensure that there are no clashes of dates.

World Championships and major games

The Championships Committee is responsible for running and promoting World Championships for men, women, juniors and masters at individual and team levels in both singles and doubles via National Federations. World Championships are run by WSF Members, who tender for the events at least four years in advance. Team Championships are held every two years; and Open/Individual Championships are held annually. The committee is also responsible for ensuring that squash is represented in all major regional multi-sport games – squash is now included in the Pan-American Games, Asian Games, Commonwealth Games, World Games Pacific Games and All Africa Games.

Olympic Games
The WSF has established an Olympic Games Committee which is responsible for conducting a high-profile campaign for squash to be accepted as a full medal sport in the Olympic Games.   (Bid)

Athletes Commission
The Athletes Commission comprises representatives from PSA. The chairman, an athlete, reports to ExCo and represents the interests of the current players in areas such as Championship Regulations and implementation of the new WADA Code.

Coaching and development
The WSF encourages the development of squash, not only in countries where it is a new sport but also where it is already well-established. Advice on all development matters is given to members and is implemented through the group of WSF specialists in the Coaching & Development Committee and via "best practice" on the WSF website. Committee Members identify needs for development projects in their regions and recommend activity plans to the WSF for resources and funding. The committee organises a Coaching Conference on an annual basis and runs coaching courses in new and developing squash nations to help develop local coaches. The committee also organises a management conference for senior executives in national associations so they can network, share resources and establish best practice on the WSF website.

Referees and rules
The Referees Committee has responsibility for implementing and running a Referees’ Programme which trains, accredits and assesses the top grade WSF Referees. A referees conference is organised on a biennial basis. The Rules Commission continually monitors the rules of the sport and makes recommendations for change. It also provides a very popular on-line rules answers service to the public at large on interpretation of the rules.

Court and equipment specifications
The Technical Committee sets standards for all technical aspects of squash, including court construction, rackets, balls, eye protection and clothing. It inspects and accredits court components which meet the specifications and works with its partner companies to promote good practice in court construction worldwide.

Anti-doping
The Anti-Doping Commission ensures that squash is fully compliant with the new WADA Code. The commission is responsible for establishing a Registered Testing Pool and an Athletes Whereabouts System for out-of-competition testing. It has established a panel of physicians which reviews Therapeutic Use Exemptions (TUE) and calls on specialist Doping Hearing and Review Panels when required.

Medical
The Medical Commission generates positive guidelines for all medical aspects of playing and training for squash. It identifies and gives medical advice on topics such as eye protection, heart health, injury prevention and injury management.

Ethics and disciplinary matters
The WSF has established an independent Ethics Panel at the suggestion of the IOC. It also has a well-established Disciplinary Committee supported by an independent Appeals Panel when necessary – this is called upon very rarely.

Promotion and publicity
The WSF delivers an information and publicity service to squash players and the sports media worldwide. Press information is circulated regularly through the WSF's media services, who are also responsible for ensuring that up-to-date information on World Championships and other major squash events appears on the WSF website.

Squash 57
The WSF renamed Racketball as Squash 57 in September 2015 to distinguish it from the sport of Racquetball, and in January 2017 updated the Standard Rules for it.

Continental association

Events
Seniors' events
World Games
World Open Squash Championships
World Team Squash Championships
World Doubles Squash Championships

Junior events
World Junior Squash Circuit
World Junior Squash Championships

University events
World University Squash Championships

Masters' events
World Masters Squash Championships

Professional association
 Professional Squash Association (PSA)

See also

England Squash
PSA World Tour
World Squash Doubles Championships
World Team Squash Championships
World Open Squash Championships

References

External links
 Official website

 
Squash
Squash organizations